Athletics at the Friendship Games was contested in 41 events, 24 events by men and 17 by women. Men competed at the Grand Arena of the Central Lenin Stadium (now Luzhniki Stadium) in Moscow, Soviet Union between 17 and 18 August, while women's events took place at the Evžen Rošický Stadium in Prague, Czechoslovakia between 16 and 18 August 1984.

One new world record was set, by East German Irina Meszynski in women's discus throw, with 73.36 m. As of 2017, it still ranks Meszynski sixth on the world all-time list.

In an unusual feat, Alberto Juantorena (Cuba) and Ryszard Ostrowski (Poland) both crossed the finish line at exactly the same moment in the men's 800 metres. After the officials were unable to split them using a photo-finish, both were declared gold medalists.

The Soviet Union dominated the final medal tally, winning 24 gold and 63 total medals. East Germany finished second, with 8 and 19 respectively.

Medal summary

Men

Women

World records broken
1 new world record was set.

Medal table

Participating nations

See also
 Athletics at the 1984 Summer Olympics

Notes

References

 

 
Friendship Games
Friendship Games
1984 in Czechoslovak sport
1984 in Soviet sport
Friendship Games
Friendship Games